A Rollins in the Wry is the ninth spoken word album by Henry Rollins, released February 27, 2001 on Quarterstick Records. It was reissued with new artwork on 2.13.61 Records on September 11, 2007. It was recorded during a nine-week stint at the Luna Park club in Los Angeles. Some recordings used in A Rollins In the Wry, along with others from his shows at Luna Park, were used for his DVD Live At Luna Park (2004).

The last track, Encore, was recorded in London on May 18, 1999. That performance was used for a Comedy Central special called Live and Ripped In London, which first aired August 11, 2000. That special is included as a bonus DVD on Provoked (2008).

Track listing
 "Intro" – 3:11
 "Death To Poets" – 0:59
 "Journal" – 4:17
 "Clintonese" – 2:03
 "Language" – 3:25
 "Never Again" – 3:25
 "The United Colors of West LA" – 9:20
 "Rite Aid" – 4:58
 "Israel" – 8:03
 "Maturity" – 9:47
 "Men In Make Up" – 6:06
 "Future Parents" – 6:38
 "Encore" – 2:20

Credits
Henry Rollins – Production & Editing
Richard Bishop – Production & Management
Rae Di Leo – Mixing
Phil Klum – Mastering
Dave Chapple – Design
Emek] – Illustration
Alison Dyer – Photography
Mike Curtis – Tour Manager

References

2001 live albums
Henry Rollins live albums
Live spoken word albums
Live comedy albums
Spoken word albums by American artists
Quarterstick Records live albums